Nariou is a town in the Sabou Department of Boulkiemdé Province in central western Burkina Faso. It has a population of 5,481.

References

Populated places in Boulkiemdé Province